Equality, Diversity and Inclusion: An International Journal is a peer-reviewed academic journal publishing research on racial, sexual, religious, disability, and age discrimination; equal opportunities; and affirmative action.

Scope

EDI is published 8 times a year. This generally consists of regular issues and special issues. The journal aims to bring to the forefront issues surrounding equal opportunities in the general Human Resource Management field of study and in academic practical applications. Duke Harrison-Hunter.

History

Equality, Diversity and Inclusion (EDI) is currently published by Emerald Group Publishing (since 2006). EDI was established in 1981 under the name Equal Opportunities International (EOI), and was changed to EDI in 2010. The editor-in-chief is Eddy Ng, who, in 2016, succeeded Regine Bendl (Vienna University of Economics and Business) (2010-2016), and Mustafa F. Özbilgin (Brunel Business School, Brunel University) (2006-2010).

The journal organizes an annual conference, the Equality, Diversity and Inclusion conference (formerly the Equal Opportunities International conference).

Editorial approach

The journal accepts submissions for articles that are aligned with the overall aim of promoting awareness and exploration of concepts related to, but not limited to, diversity, inequalities, inclusion, discrimination, and equal opportunity. Authors may submit papers for regular issues that are aligned with the scope of the journal.

Special Issues are led by guest editors who are eminent experts on a particular topic.

Leading articles and ideas

Some examples of articles and ideas covered in the journal are women in STEM; growing diversity in across organizations and societies; inclusive workplace behavior; institutional racism; and influences of ethnicity, gender, and immigration status.

Readership

EDI is read and used as a tool by those in higher education who teach management courses. It is also a useful tool for those in the human resource and management fields in the corporate sector.

Abstracting and indexing

ABI/Inform ProQuest, British Library Direct, Business Source Alumni Edition/Complete/Government Edition/Corporate Plus/Elite/Premier, CSA Worldwide Political Science Abstracts, EBSCO Host, Educational Management Abstracts, Emerald Full Text, Emerging Sources Citation Index, FRANCIS (International Humanities and Social Sciences), Informatics J-Gate, Ingenta Connect, International Abstracts of Human Resources, IBSS (International Bibliography of the Social Sciences), Multicultural Management Abstracts, OCLC Online First Search, ReadCube Discovery, Sociological Abstracts, Sociology of Education Abstracts, Studies on Women and Gender Abstracts, SwetsWise, TOC Premier (EBSCO), Ulrich's Reference Source

See also
Environmental, social, and corporate governance
Diversity, equity, and inclusion

References 

Publications established in 1981
Sociology journals
English-language journals
Emerald Group Publishing academic journals